Lurs is a commune in the Alpes-de-Haute-Provence department in the Provence-Alpes-Côte d'Azur region in southeastern France.

It is noted for the triple murder nearby of Sir Jack Drummond and his wife and daughter in 1952.

Population

The inhabitants are referred to as Lursiens.

See also
 Chapel of Notre Dame des Anges
Communes of the Alpes-de-Haute-Provence department

References

Communes of Alpes-de-Haute-Provence
Alpes-de-Haute-Provence communes articles needing translation from French Wikipedia